The Gutiérrez Province is a province of the Colombian Department of Boyacá. The province is formed by six municipalities. The province is named after Colombian president José Santos Gutiérrez. The highest mountains of the Eastern Ranges of the Colombian Andes are located in the Gutiérrez Province. The Ritacuba Blanco, with  the highest peak in the Eastern Ranges is the second-most prominent peak of Colombia, after the highest double mountain Pico Cristóbal Colón.

Municipalities 
Chiscas • El Cocuy • El Espino • Guacamayas • Güicán • Panqueba

References 

Provinces of Boyacá Department